Freek is a masculine given name. It is a Dutch-language diminutive of Frederik.

People
It may refer to:

 Freek Bezuidenhout (1773-1815) Boer rebel of Cape Colony
 Freek de Jonge (born 1944) Dutch artist
 Freek Golinski (born 1991) Belgium badminton player
 Freek Heerkens (born 1989) Dutch soccer player
 Freek Rikkerink known by the mononym Freek, Dutch singer and part of the Dutch musical duo Suzan & Freek
 Freek Thoone (born 1985) Dutch soccer player
 Freek van de Graaff (1944-2009) Dutch rower
 Freek van der Wart (born 1988) Dutch short track speed skater
 Freek Vonk (born 1983) Dutch biologist
 Freek Vos (born 1997) Dutch basketball player

See also
 Freak (disambiguation)
 Fred (name), the equivalent English-language diminutive of Frederic

Given names